William R. Callahan (April 27, 1925 – January 1976) was a Democratic member of the Massachusetts House of Representatives. He was a Malden resident who represented the 16th Middlesex district for one term, from 1971 to 1973. Before serving in the state legislature, he was a member of the Malden Common Council for two years and the Malden City Council for 14 years. He was a member of multiple organizations, including the Knights of Columbus and the Ancient Order of Hibernians.

References 

Democratic Party members of the Massachusetts House of Representatives
Massachusetts city council members
Politicians from Malden, Massachusetts
1925 births
1976 deaths
20th-century American politicians